Hazel Grove High School is an 11–18 mixed secondary school and sixth form with academy status in Hazel Grove, Stockport, Greater Manchester, England.

History 
The school became part of The Laurus Trust in September 2019 .

Hazel Grove Sixth Form 
There is a Sixth Form on the site, it is currently being redeveloped. The redevelopment is due to be completed in September 2023 with full classrooms, ICT resources, Library, Refectory, Auditorium and Independent Study facilities.

Notable alumni 

 Sarah Harding, singer-songwriter, dancer, model and actress
 Steve Penk, radio and television presenter
 Tim Scott, instrumental recording artist
 Jon Willis, professional fencer
 Graeme Shimmin, novelist and blogger

Notable staff or former staff
 Sue Robbie

References

External links 
 

Secondary schools in the Metropolitan Borough of Stockport
Academies in the Metropolitan Borough of Stockport